Dev Mogra (also Devmogra or Yaah Devmogi) is a figure in Adivasi mythology, a goddess for the Satpuda mountain people. It is mainly Totem (kuldevi) to a tribals living for centuries in the surrounding areas specially in Gujarat and Maharashtra.

There is a temple to this goddess on a mountain near the city of  Sagbara in the state of Gujarat, India. The temple was said to have been created seven generations back when the then high-priest saw a vision of Dev Mogra.

There is an annual festival at the temple from February to March where an estimated 5 to 7 Lakh (500,000 to 700,000) people attend.

The traditions of the tribals are related to nature as they live, nature and their God. Yahamogi, the goddess of Satpuda, is the only goddess of the tribe of Satpuda Vidhya Hills in Maharashtra-Gujarat.

Whenever you go to any village, there is a small temple. But in the tribal society, idols and temples are not the only concept. In the area with many shrubs, a circular stone or planted wooden trunk appears to symbolize God. But it is limited to symbols. Even today, in the tribal villages of Satpuda, such deities are openly seen on the pedestal.

He has no roof or daily worship there. But this is the great place of the Yahamogi in Satpuda. The village of Dab in Akkalkuwa taluka, located in the picturesque region of the Satpuda Mountains and the Sagbara Taluka (District Narmada), in the vicinity of the Bagla river in Gujarat, are the shrines of Yahamogi Devi. In Devamogara, formerly a lunar eclipse, the house of Chandramauli was covered with grass. There is now a beautiful temple with roof slopes as per the size of the aboriginal house. Yahamogi, Devamogara and Yah Panduri are the names of many tribes whose mothers are revered. Mother's journey takes place between February and April in the holy festival of Mahashivratri. Tribal people will not be seen worshiping any other deities. But there are very devout devotees of Yahamogi. On a small pedestal, a red-and-white flag appears on Yahamogi. There is rarely a temple on the shrine of a goddess. But the place of reverence for all is Devamogara.

King Taramahal was the head of Aambudapari on the western side of the pressure circle. Raja Pantha, son of their queen Umravanu. He was very brave, proficient in science. The king had nine queens. Its pattrani was devrupan. She was the daughter of Bahgoria Kothar. Devamogramata was the daughter of Manas Devgondar, queen of Baghoria and the goddess of King Goria Kothar. Bhagodarya and Devgondara had one son. It was either Ada Thakor or Vina Thakor. Due to the marriage of Devamogara mother to King Patha, both Raja Pantha and Vinathakore were good friends and relatives. They are called Benihejaha in tribal language. They were both very mighty, powerful, and intelligent.

Devamogara mother was the fourth child of a rich tribal family in Mavasar Pati (navapur) area of Dab state. Due to the drought in those areas, they were under pressure to look for food. There was no food due to the drought, but it was also destroyed by tubers. Therefore, they were disturbed by hunger and lay dying under a tree in the forest in a flower vine. At the same time, the king of Dab was came for hunting in jungle. They found her  in a dying state. They brought her home and nurtured her like a beloved daughter. Yahamogi is also known as Pohli Pandor as an orphan girl found in the forest. Or, also known as Devamogara, because it is found in a vine and shrub like a flower. He was married to King Pantha. King Panta had to stay with the cavalry for seven years. That meant serving as a housemaid. Later, due to some housework, Raja Pantha and Mata Mogara moved to the present village of Devamogara (Taluka Sagarbara, Gujarat) where the temple of Devamogara is now. Later, mothers started to live in small huts and due to the trouble and embarrassing treatment by other queens. During the same period, 12 years of drought occurred in the state of pressure. The cattle, the cattle, all died. People started dying without food. They started leaving the village. The state of pressure began to desist. At that time, Yahmogi boldly went to the surrounding kingdom and brought food, grains, animals to the kingdom with the help of King Pantha, Vinathakor. The hunger strike in the state provided food and livestock to the victims. Because of their humanitarian work, they were called 'Yaha'. Yaha, that's mother. Because of this work of 'yaha mogi' they are known as food gods. That is why tribals worship 'yaha mogi' with food. After the death of 'devmogra', (yaha mogi) his husband Raja and brother Ganda Thakore made idols of mother and made them into clay bases. But for fear of foreign invasion, later generations of King sons hide the idol of the mother in the ground. Eventually, the kings of Sagbara state went hunting, and found a mother idol in the forest. They traditionally built a house surrounded by grass, like the tribal houses, and built a statue of the mother.

During the Mahashivratri night, there is jatra and traditional worship is performed there. Earlier, there were goats, raida victims. Chickens and alcohol were then offered. Raw grains are used in this worship of the aborigines. Like all these rituals, mothers' relationships do not match those of other established religions. The mother is established in a clay box. She is also called 'koni mata'. The tribal people store the treasures in a box, so the idol has been established in the closet. The information about the mother idol is that the idol of Panduri mother is in Nandurbar district and in Narmada district of Gujarat, the tribal women live in traditional costumes. It is called 'khoyati'. It consists of one part of the pulpit and the other part to be taken from the head. The mother has a small copper in one hand. It is called 'Kolihi'. It is a symbol of milk milk. Also in the other hand is 'doodo'. This rope is left on the shoulders as cows and buffaloes use to bind animals. Therefore, the tribals still carry the ropes on their shoulders.

Devamogara Mata was founded in the forests as mentioned above and it was founded by Hiroji Chauhan, a rajput king about one and a half thousand years ago. Sagbara is the capital of the rajput(chauhan) king. Sagbara is currently located in the district and is located in Narmada district. Devotees of mothers come in large numbers from all four states of Gujarat, Maharashtra, Rajasthan and Madhya Pradesh. There are other tribals coming from all over the country. During the visit to the mothers, the tribal people tied the basket made of bamboo with white cloth. It contains rice, gourmet flower wine caps, bangles, sindoor, agarbatti, coconut, betel nut. Mothers take them to the altar. There is also a fried chicken or goat. This basket for worship is called Hijari.
In Goed, it is believed that the mother's husband, Raja Pantha, lives. Therefore, the mother idol is taken there once a year for bathing. At Devamogara, Goad(गड ) is located about half a kilometer to the west of the Mother's Temple. There is such a belief of the couple (the couple was meeting), so women are not likely to go to that place. There is no such ban.

Previously there was only one rock at Goad.(गड ) He worshiped to understand the image of King Pantha. Also, there is a wooden crocodile from earlier. He is also worshiped. Magara is also worshiped in Africa. That is, it seems that tribal tribes maintain the same customary traditions at the back of the world.

Legend
One myth about this goddess is that she was a beautiful princess. Many princes and maharaja wanted to marry her. She had one sister named Pandori Mata. Because Dev Mogra Mata is beautiful, no one wants to marry her sister. Dev Mogra then decided to go to live in the jungle.

Another was that she came to that jungle when Pandava passed through Vanavas.

References 

Hindu goddesses